The 2020–21 III liga was the 13th season of the fourth tier domestic division in the Polish football league system since its establishment in 2008 under its current title (III liga) and the 5th season under its current league division format.

The competition was contested by 84 clubs split geographically across 4 groups, with the winners of each group gaining promotion to the II liga. The season was played in a round-robin tournament. It began in August 2020 and ended in June 2021. The teams included semi-professional clubs (although a few are professional) and the reserve teams of professional clubs.

From October 17, 2020, due to the COVID-19 pandemic restrictions, all III liga football matches take place behind closed doors without any spectators.

Format

84 teams are divided into four groups according to geographical criteria:
 Group I (Łódź – Masovian – Podlaskie – Warmian-Masurian)
 Group II (Kuyavian-Pomeranian – Greater Poland – Pomeranian – West Pomeranian)
 Group III (Lower Silesian – Lubusz – Opole – Silesian)
 Group IV (Świętokrzyskie – Lesser Poland – Lublin – Podkarpackie)

Each group of III liga is managed by a different voivodship football association. In the 2020–21 season these are the following regionals federations:
 Group I – Łódź Football Association
 Group II – Pomeranian Football Association
 Group III – Opole Football Association
 Group IV – Świętokrzyskie Football Association

Changes from last season
The following teams have changed division since the 2019–20 season.

To III liga

From III liga

League tables

Group 1

Group 2

Group 3

Group 4

See also
 2020–21 Ekstraklasa
 2020–21 I liga
 2020–21 II liga
 2020–21 Polish Cup

Notes

References

External link
 Official website 

2020–21
2020–21 in Polish football
Poland